The minute wrasse (Minilabrus striatus) is a species of wrasse endemic to the Red Sea, where it can be found down to about  over reefs. Minilabrus striatus is the only known member of its genus.

References

Labridae
Monotypic fish genera
Fish described in 1980